Skinflint is a heavy metal band from Gaborone, Botswana. They have incorporated elements from African culture into heavy metal music, attracting the attention of international media. Their releases, Iklwa, Gauna and Dipoko, pay homage to ancestral beliefs and African spirituality, while the band still plays in the vein of traditional heavy metal.

Band history

Formation (2006) 

Skinflint was founded by lead guitarist and vocalist Giuseppe Sbrana in 2006. He recruited Kebonye Nkoloso on bass guitar and Alessandra Sbrana on drums.

Skinflint's music mixes elements of local traditional music with heavy metal, inspired by Iron Maiden and Black Sabbath.

Line-up change: the Iklwa era (2007–2011) 

Drummer Alessandra Sbrana parted ways with Skinflint in 2007, and was replaced by Mothusi Mahuri. The band then began writing Massive Destruction, which was released on 6 June 2009. The album was never distributed outside of Botswana. In 2010 the band recorded their second album, Iklwa, and later launched the album at the Whiplash Metal festival in Cape Town, South Africa on 11 December 2010. Iklwa was distributed by Legion of Death records and later by Pure Steel Records.

Gauna era (2011–2012) 

The band produced a 7-inch EP titled Gauna with Legion of Death records, featuring three exclusive songs, "Mantis Skull", "Bloody Gqokli", and "Gauna". The release also included a live version of the song "Iklwa", as a bonus track.

In 2012, the band was interviewed by Errol Barnett of CNN and performed the title track, "Gauna", live for CNN's Inside Africa after the interview.

Dipoko era (2012–present) 

Mothusi Mahuri parted ways with Skinflint, and Alessandra Sbrana returned to the helm for drum duties. The band began recording Dipoko and launched the album at the Nairobi Rock fest on 8 December 2012, in Nairobi, Kenya. In July 2013 Dipoko was re-released through Pure Steel Records, and the band embarked on their first European tour.

Upon their return, the band was interviewed by Mark Tutton, where Giuseppe Sbrana discussed the expansion, and interest in the African metal scene. In 2019, Sbrana would leave the band for a second time. Her replacement was Cosmos Modisaemang.

Discography

Band members

Current band members 

Giuseppe Sbrana: vocals, guitar (2006–present)
Kebonye Nkoloso: bass (2006–present)
Cosmos Modisaemang: drums (2019–present)

Past band members 

Alessandra Sbrana: drums (2006–2007, 2012–2019)
Mothusi Mahuri: drums (2007–2012)

Timeline

References

External links 
 

Botswana heavy metal musical groups
Musical groups established in 2006
Musical trios